Snop or SNOP may refer to:
 Snop, Bulgaria, a village in Bulgaria
 Systematized Nomenclature of Pathology
 Shell Nigeria Oil Products, a subsidiary of Shell Nigeria

See also 
 Snope